Osoba is a surname. Notable people with the surname include:

 Olusegun Osoba (born 1939), Nigerian journalist and politician
 Tony Osoba (born 1947), Scottish actor

See also
 Re Osoba, English trusts law case between members of an Osoba family